Saturday Night Live  was the Spanish localisation of the popular US-comedy television series Saturday Night Live which was shown on Cuatro and produced by Globomedia.

Format
Each episode follow the same structure, first the host of the episode participates a in sketch that ends with the phrase "¡estamos en directo y esto es Saturday Night Live!" (We are live and this is Saturday Night Live!). Then, it is followed by the program header followed by the host's monologue. Several sketches are then performed afterward and finally the show ends with the segment "Las noticias del SNL" (The SNL news) presented by Gorka Otxoa and Eva Hache and a performance by a guest artist or band.

Cast

Main cast
 Eva Hache
 Yolanda Ramos
 Secun de la Rosa
 Edu Soto
 Gorka Otxoa

Recurring cast
 Daniel Ortiz
 Meritxell Duró
 Lucas Trapaza
 Manuela Burló
 César Camino
 Meritxell Huertas
 Ota Vallés

References

External links

Saturday Night Live